Krasimir Anev; born 16 June 1987 in Samokov) is a Bulgarian former biathlete.

His best result for the World Cup is a 4th place in the mass start in Oberhof, Germany, in the fourth race of the 2014/15 season. He competed at nine Biathlon World Championships between 2008 and 2017 and the Olympic Games in Vancouver in 2010, in Sochi in 2014 and in Pyeongchang in 2018. He ended his career after the 2019/20 season.

Biathlon results
All results are sourced from the International Biathlon Union.

Olympic Games
0 medals

*The mixed relay was added as an event in 2014.

World Championships
0 medals

*During Olympic seasons competitions are only held for those events not included in the Olympic program.
**The mixed relay was added as an event in 2005.

References

External links
 Anev on IBU.com
 Anev on Biathlon.com.ua

Biathletes at the 2010 Winter Olympics
Biathletes at the 2014 Winter Olympics
Biathletes at the 2018 Winter Olympics
Bulgarian male biathletes
Olympic biathletes of Bulgaria
Universiade medalists in biathlon
1987 births
Living people
People from Samokov
Universiade silver medalists for Bulgaria
Universiade bronze medalists for Bulgaria
Competitors at the 2011 Winter Universiade
Sportspeople from Sofia Province
20th-century Bulgarian people
21st-century Bulgarian people